Burdachia is a genus in the Malpighiaceae, a family of about 75 genera of flowering plants in the order Malpighiales. Burdachia comprises 3 species of trees and shrubs occurring in lowland forests near rivers or in low, periodically flooded places in Guyana and Amazonian Venezuela, Colombia, Brazil, and Peru.

External links
Malpighiaceae Malpighiaceae - description, taxonomy, phylogeny, and nomenclature
Burdachia

Malpighiaceae
Malpighiaceae genera